Peykulah (also Romanized as Peykūlah; also known as Pey Kolā, Peykolah, and Pey Koleh) is a village in Gowavar Rural District, Govar District, Gilan-e Gharb County, Kermanshah Province, Iran. At the 2006 census, its population was 73, in 18 families.

References 

Populated places in Gilan-e Gharb County